Arctotis acaulis is a species of flowering plant in the family Asteraceae and is an endemic species found in the Cape Provinces, South Africa.

Etymology
The species name acaulis means without a stem, from Greek a which means without, and caulis meaning stem of a plant. The name refers to the species growth habit.

Reference

acaulis
Taxa named by Carl Linnaeus
Flora of South Africa